Eyal (lit. power) is a kibbutz in the Central District of Israel. Located close to the Green line, it falls under the jurisdiction of the Drom HaSharon Regional Council.

Geography
Eyal is located in central Israel within the green line in the central Sharon region, and just to the east of Highway 6. It is approximately 6 km north-east of the city of Kfar Saba. Just to its north-east is the city of Kokhav Ya'ir, and west of the city of Tzur Yigal. To its north-west is the Israeli Arab city of Tira, and to its south is the Palestinian city of Qalqilyah.

History
Eyal was established in 1949 by Nahal volunteers. Israel sought to establish security settlements along its borders, and Eyal was established on what was then the Jordanian border. It is just north of the West Bank town of Qalqilyah.

Attractions
Keren Sahar Vintage Auto Museum houses a collection of vintage cars, featuring British automobiles from the 1930s and 1940s.

Saslove Winery has a temperature-controlled barrel room, a lab, and an open space where the club meetings and wine seminars are held.

In a field not far from the kibbutz sits a small domed structure, traditionally the burial place of Simeon, son of the patriarch Jacob.

References

External links
Official website 
The Kibbutzim / Qassams, terrorism don´t cow kibbutzim article written by Eli Ashkenazi, 11/08, 2004, for Haaretz. The article describes how Kibbutz Eyal had become a prime example of a kibbutz absorbing new people in order to recover from its sagging social and economic situation.
From Russia with Jews article written by Yossi Melman and Amiram Barkat, Haaretz, Edition Thursday, November 9, 2006; The story of Zvi Magen, former head of Nativ, who immigrated to Israel in 1960, lived on Kibbutz Gan Shmuel as an "external child, and after completing his army service, joined a settlement Kibbutz Eyal.

Kibbutzim
Kibbutz Movement
Populated places established in 1949
Nahal settlements
Populated places in Central District (Israel)
1949 establishments in Israel